Temagami-Lorrain Mine is an abandoned surface and underground mine in Northeastern Ontario, Canada. It is named after the Temagami-Lorrain Mining Company, which carried out work on the property in the early 1900s.

Development by the Temagami-Lorrain Mining Company consisted of trenching, stripping and sinking of a  shaft in fractured Nipissing diabase. The primary commodities mined at Temagami-Lorrain were cobalt and gold. Secondary commodities included arsenic, silver, nickel and copper. In 1925, samples from the waste rock dump showed considerable cobalt bloom and one of the richest had an analysis of 5.87% cobalt, 0.12% nickel, 1.08% copper, 12.48% iron, 14.17% sulfur, 10.39% arsenic,  of gold and traces of silver.

See also
List of mines in Temagami

References

External links

Mines in Temagami
Cobalt mines in Canada
Gold mines in Ontario
Arsenic mines in Canada
Silver mines in Canada
Nickel mines in Canada
Copper mines in Ontario